Felix Ellison Feist (February 28, 1910 – September 2, 1965) was an American film and television director and writer born in New York City. He is probably best remembered for Deluge (1933), for writing and directing the film noirs The Devil Thumbs a Ride (1947) and The Threat (1949), and for helming the second screen version of the Curt Siodmak sci-fi tale Donovan's Brain (1953), which starred Nancy Davis before she became known as Nancy Reagan.

He directed Judy Garland and Deanna Durbin in their first significant screen appearances, in the 1936 short film Every Sunday.

Life
Feist was the son of a MGM sales executive, Felix F. Feist (1884–1936), and nephew of a publishing house magnate, Leo Feist. He was educated at Columbia University. In the late 1920s he found work as a newsreel cameraman, and he was on staff at MGM from 1929 to 1932, directing screen tests and producing one-reel travelogues.

In 1931, Feist married Dorothy Hart Jacobs. The two met in New York, NY, and traveled to Los Angeles together where Feist began his career with MGM. They had two daughters, Marjory and Jacqueline Ellison.

His second marriage was to Lisa Howard, a pioneering female journalist and television news anchor, who briefly had an acting career. She appeared in a few of his films such as The Man Who Cheated Himself, Guilty of Treason, and Donovan's Brain. They had a daughter, Fritzi.

In 1955, he married Lulu Estelle "Barbara" Allen, whose son, Raymond, he adopted. Raymond became a fantasy author.

Feist died of cancer on September 2, 1965, at the age of 55. In his obituary, it was reported that he had three sons and three daughters.

Filmography

 I Credited for the lyrics of "Lo-Lo"
 II Credited for the screenplay
 III Credited as a composer
 IV Credited as a writer
 V Uncredited
 VI Credited for the story
 VII Credited for the original screenplay

Television

References

External links
 .

American film directors
American television directors
American male screenwriters
1910 births
1965 deaths
20th-century American male writers
20th-century American screenwriters